Devil Hunters is a 1989 Hong Kong action film written and directed by Tony Lo and starring Alex Man, Sibelle Hu, Moon Lee and Ray Lui. The film was released as Ultra Force 2 in the west as a sequel to the film, Killer Angels which was released a few months earlier as Ultra Force. Although both films were directed by Lo and starred Lee, Devil Hunters is unrelated to Killer Angels.

Plot
At the Happy Dragon Recreation Park, Hong Kong's two notorious drug lords, Hon San (Wong Wai) and Chai Yan (Lau Siu-ming) leads their respective group of underlings carry out a huge drug trade. Police superintendent Tsang (Alex Man) leads chief inspector Tong Fung (Sibelle Hu), Man (Candy Wen) and other sergeants and laid a dragnet for a cleansweep of the two drug traffickers. However, during the drug trade, the ambush by the police was exposed by Chun Bing (Moon Lee), a master of multiple identities, and Chai Yuet (Ray Lui), a tough, ruthless fighter, both of whom engage in a fierce gun battle with the police. Hon believes the incident was a result of Chai betraying him and tipping the police. As a result, Hon's his right hand man, Chiu Sing (Francis Ng), to murder Chai, while Chai's son, Yuet, swears vengeance.

Hon's authority has been usurped by Chiu (Francis Ng), who forces Hon to hand him a large sum of gems from his estate when Chiu frames Hon for the murder of Chai. One of Hon's underlings, Wu Kin (Cheng Hong-yip), attempts to protect his boss but was killed by Chiu. Another one of Hong's underlings, Yin Fu (Michael Chan)'s family is being held hostage by Chiu, who forces him to betray Hon. Once Yin's family was released, he attempts to save Hon but was also killed by Chiu. However, before Yin died, he has informed the police about the case and the police sets up a special task force consists of Bing, who is Hon's daughter, Yuet and Tong to counter against Chiu. When Chiu attempts to take the gems from Hon's estate, he was surrounded by the police. After an intense battle, Hon was killed by Chiu, who in turn, was blown up in a LPG explosion.

Cast
Alex Man as Superintendent Tsang 
Sibelle Hu as Tong Fung 
Moon Lee as Chun Bing 
Ray Lui as Chai Yuet 
Candy Wen as Man
Francis Ng as Chiu Sing
Michael Chan as Yin Fu
Wong Wai as Hon San
Andy Tai as Ngai Yuen
Ken Lo as Chai Biu
Chan Pui-kei as Hon Suet
Tong Kam-tong as Seung To
Cheng Hong-yip as Wu KIn
Lau Siu-ming as Chai Yan
Lau Hung-fong
Kellie Lam
Kwan Kwok-chung
Joe Chu as Policeman
Frank Liu as Policeman
Cheng Yuen-man
Derek Kok
Leung Ching
Mak Wai-cheung
James Ha
Wan Seung-lam
Lau Shung-fung
Samo Ho
Ridley Tsui
Fan Chin-hung
Choi Kwok-keung
Hau Woon-ling
Jack Wong
Wong Man-sing
Chang Sing-kwong
Ma Yuk-sing
Lung Sang
Lee Yiu-king

Production
During the filming of the film's final scene where cast members Sibelle Hu, Moon Lee and Ray Lui jumped out of an exploding building, a mishap occurred due to poor timing by pyrotechnics, causing Hu and Lee to be engulfed in flames and suffer third degree burns. The ending of the film featured a message praising the trio for their professionalism and also featured shots of newspaper reports of the incident as the credits roll.

Reception

Critical
In the book, The Hong Kong Filmography, 1977–1997: A Reference Guide to 1,100 Films Produced by British Hong Kong Studios, John Charles gave the film a score of 6/10 and criticizes the under cranking but praises the choreography of the action scenes. Hong Kong Film Net  gave the film a score of 7/10 and praises the film's stunt work while also noting the light expository scenes. Asian Film Strike gave the film a score of 2.5/5 praising the character, drama and action scenes, but criticizes its uninvolving plot and exploitative scenes.

Box office
The film grossed HK$$5,055,340 at the Hong Kong box office during its theatrical run from 10 to 23 August 1989.

References

External links

Devil Hunters at Hong Kong Cinemagic

1989 films
1980s action thriller films
1989 martial arts films
Hong Kong action thriller films
Hong Kong martial arts films
Gun fu films
Police detective films
Triad films
Girls with guns films
1980s Cantonese-language films
Films about the illegal drug trade
Films set in Hong Kong
Films shot in Hong Kong
1980s Hong Kong films